Qeytaniyeh (also Romanized as Qeyţānīyeh and Qaitānīyeh) is a village in Shahsavan Kandi Rural District, in the Central District of Saveh County, Markazi Province, Iran. At the 2006 census, its population was 166, in 53 families.

References 

Populated places in Saveh County